The Sounds of Simon is the sixth studio album recorded by American singer Joe Simon, released in 1971 on the Spring Records label.

Chart performance
The album peaked at No. 9 on the R&B albums chart. It also reached No. 153 on the Billboard 200. The album features the singles "Your Time to Cry", which peaked at No. 3 on the Hot Soul Singles chart and No. 40 on the Billboard Hot 100, and "Help Me Make It Through the Night", which reached No. 13 on the Hot Soul Singles Chart and No. 69 on the Billboard Hot 100.

Track listing

Charts

Singles

References

External links
 

1971 albums
Joe Simon (musician) albums
Spring Records albums